BBVA Perú (formerly BBVA Banco Continental) is a Peruvian bank and subsidiary of Holding Continental (an affiliate of BBVA) which holds 92.08% of its equity.

History 
The bank was established in 1951, and its operations are authorized by the Superintendencia de Banca, Seguros y AFP (SBS). Its principal offices are located in Av. República de Panamá No. 3055, San Isidro District, Peru.

BBVA Continental is the result of the merger of Banco Continental with Banco Bilbao Vizcaya and Grupo Breca in 1995.

In June 2011, the Fitch credit rating agency raised BBVA Continental's investment grade from BBB to A-.

The bank conducts its business through 311 branches located in different regions of Peru. As of February 2014, it had 5,429 employees.

In 2014, Global Finance ranked BBVA Continental the "Best Bank in Peru."

On June 10,​ 2019, BBVA unifies its brand worldwide and BBVA Continental is renamed BBVA.

In July 2019, Fernando Eguiluz becomes CEO of BBVA Perú.

See also
 BBVA in Mexico
 BBVA in Argentina
 BBVA Provincial
 BBVA in the United States

External links
BBVA Continental official site

References

Banco Bilbao Vizcaya Argentaria
Banks of Peru
Banks established in 1951
Brescia family
1951 establishments in Peru